The following is an episode list for All That, a sketch comedy, variety series that premiered on April 16, 1994 on Nickelodeon and was broadcast as part of their SNICK (1994–2004) and TEENick (2001–2005) program blocks. The series was created by Brian Robbins and Mike Tollin.

Nickelodeon's All That 10th Anniversary Reunion Special was a 10-year anniversary reunion that aired on April 23, 2005. It featured crossover sketches, numerous guest celebrities, the cast members from the past and present, and was hosted by Frankie Muniz.

During the course of the series, 206 episodes of All That aired over eleven seasons.

Series overview

Episodes

Season 1 (1994–95)

Season 2 (1995–96)

Season 3 (1996–97)

Season 4 (1997–98)

Season 5 (1998–99)

Season 6 (2000–01)

Season 7 (2002)

Season 8 (2002–03)

Season 9 (2003–04)

Season 10 (2005)

Season 11 (2019–20)

Notes

References

External links
TV Guide's All That episode list

Lists of variety television series episodes
Episodes
Lists of Nickelodeon television series episodes